Ypsolopha divisella is a moth of the family Ypsolophidae. It is known from France.

The wingspan is 16–17 mm.

The larvae feed Ephedra altissima

References

External links
lepiforum.de

Ypsolophidae
Moths of Europe